The Vishalakshi Temple or Vishalakshi Gauri Temple is a Hindu temple dedicated to the goddess Vishalakshi (Viśālākshī, "she who has large eyes"), (an aspect of the goddess Parvati/Gauri) at Mir Ghat on the banks of the Ganges  at Varanasi in Uttar Pradesh, India. It is generally regarded as a Shakti Pitha, the most sacred temples dedicated to the Hindu Divine Mother.

The earrings of the goddess Sati are said to have fallen on this holy spot of Varanasi. The temple is situated by the famous cremation grounds of  Manikarnika. Vishalakshi Temple is known for its temple festival on Kajali Tij, held on the third day during waning fortnight in the Hindu month of Bhadrapada (August).There are 4 incarnations of Adi parashakti ( Kamakshi in  kanchi) is worshipped. Vishalakshi in North in kashi, Renukakshi(Padmakshi) in West alibag or shreebag, Meenakshi in South and Bahulakshi in East.

Religious significance

The daughter of Prajapati Daksha, Sati was married to the god Shiva against his wishes. Daksha organized a great yajna, but did not invite Sati and Shiva. Uninvited, Sati reached the yajna-site, where Daksha ignored Sati and vilified Shiva. Unable to withstand this insult, Sati jumped into the sacrificial fire and committed suicide. Sati died, but her corpse did not burn. Shiva (as Virabhadra) slew Daksha for being responsible for Sati's death and forgave him, resurrecting him. The wild, grief-stricken Shiva wandered the universe with Sati's corpse. Finally, the god Vishnu dismembered the body of Sati into 51 parts, each of which became a Shakti Pitha, temple to a form of the Goddess. Shiva is also worshipped at each Shakti Pitha in the form of Bhairava, the male counterpart or guardian of the presiding goddess of the Pitha. Sati's eye or earring is believed to have fallen at Varanasi, establishing Vishalakshi as a Shakti Pitha. However, if one asks at the temple there today, the priest and all others aver that the body part that fell was Her face, which is hidden behind the murti.

In the sacred geography of Varanasi, six points are said to symbolize Shastanga (six-fold) yoga, which is performing by visiting the six sites. They are the Vishwanath Temple (the most important temple of Varanasi - dedicated to Shiva), the Vishalakshi Temple, the Ganges, the Kala Bhairava temple (dedicated to Varanasi's guardian deity and Vishalakshi's Bhiarava), the Dhundiraj Temple (dedicated to the god Ganesha - son of Shiva and Parvati) and the Dandapani temple (dedicated to an aspect of Shiva).

In Shakti Peetha lists
Vishalakshi (Sanskrit: विशालाक्षी) or Varanasi figures in most standard lists of Shakti Peethas.

The Tantric work Rudrayamala, composed before 1052 CE, mentions 10 principal Shakti Peethas, which includes Varanasi as the fifth one. The Kularnava Tantra mentions 18 Pithas and mentions Varanasi as the sixth one. The Ashadashapitha (18 Peethas) ascribed to Shankaracharya (interpreted as Adi Shankara, however probably Shankara Agamacharya, Bengali author of the Tara-rahasya-vrittika)  enumerates 18 names along with their presiding deities or Pitha-devis including Vishalakshi of Varanasi as the fifth Pitha. In the Kubjika Tantra, Varanasi is third in 42 names. There are the two lists of Pithas in the Jnanarnava, one with 8 names and the other with fifty names. The 8-name list does not mention Varanasi, but the other list names Varanasi in the second spot. Vishalakshi of Varanasi is mentioned as first of 108 Shakti Pithas in the list in the Devi Bhagavata Purana. The face of Sati is described to have fallen here. This is the only instance where a body part is related to the Shakti Pitha in the text. The Devi Gita within the same text gives a long list of Pithas, where Vishalakshi is mentioned as dwelling in Avimukta (Varanasi). No body part is related to the Pitha in this list. In the non-scripture 16th century Bengali work Chandimangal, Mukundaram lists nine Pithas in the Daksha-yajna-bhanga section. Varanasi is the last Peetha described to be the place where Sati's chest fell and the presiding goddess being Vishalakshi. Lakshmidhara also includes Vishalakshi in his 12th-century list.

The Pithanirnaya or Mahapithanirupana section from the Tantrachudamani originally listed 43 names, but names were added over time making it 51 Peethas. It details the Pitha-devata or Devi (name of goddess at the Pitha), the Kshastradishas (Bhairava, consort of the goddess) and the anga-pratyanga (limbs including ornaments of Sati). Manikarnika at Varanasi with Vishalakshi as the presiding goddess comes in at number 23. A kundala (earring) is the anga-pratyanga and Kala-Bhairava (Kala) is the consort. In some later versions of the text, Varanasi is not included in the chief 51/52 Pithas. In one of the versions, it is demoted from a Pitha to an upa-Pitha (subordinate Pitha). Here, the kundala is said to be anga-pratyanga, but two Pitha-devatas and Bhairavas are mentioned. First, Vishalakshi with Kala-Bhairava and secondary Annapurna with Vishweshvara. Vishweshvara is the presiding deity of Kashi Vishwanath Temple, the most important temple in Varanasi and the Annapurna temple is nearby.

History

Annapurna, the goddess of food and form of Shiva's consort Parvati, is given the epithet Vishalakshi, the "wide-eyed". Her most famous temple stands at Varanasi, where patron goddess she is considered. The Skanda Purana narrates the tale of the sage Vyasa cursing Varanasi, as no one in the city offered him food. Finally, Vishalakshi appears in the form of a housewife and grants food to Vyasa. This role of Vishalakshi is similar to that of Annapurna, who offers food to her husband Shiva, whose hunger can be satiated by her food. Shiva gratified by Annapurna's food, establishes Varanasi and appoints her as its presiding goddess. The goddess Vishalakshi of the Varanasi temple may have been identified with Annapurna in early times, however over time became a distinct goddess, resulting in the goddess temples.

Vishalakshi, the "wide-eyed" goddess is often associated two other goddesses: Kamakshi, the "love-eyed" goddess of Kanchipuram and Minakshi, the "fish-eyed" of Madurai, prominently because of their similar names. Together the three are regarded the most important Goddess temples by South Indians. While Vishalakshi dwells in North India, the other goddess temples are in Tamil Nadu, South India. South Indians venerated Vishalakshi for ages and have strong ties with the temple. South Indian Tamil people also helped renovate the temple in 1971.

Worship and festivals
Devotees often bathe in the holy Ganges nearby before offering worship at the temple. The puja (worship), offerings, recitation of hymns to the goddess and charity at the temple is considered highly fruitful because of the power of the presiding goddess. The goddess is especially worshipped by unmarried girls for a groom, childless couples for progeny and unfortunate women for the turn of their fortune. Two goddess images are housed side by side in the garbhagirha (sanctum): a smaller black stone image called Adi Vishalakshi on left back side and another taller black stone image installed at a later date. Devotees often visit the Vishwanath and Annapurna shrines with this temple.

Two most important festivals in the temple, as well as all other goddess temples in Varanasi, is two Navaratris ("nine nights"). The Ashwin Navatri or simply called Navaratri, culminating in Vijayadashami, falls in the waxing fortnight of the Hindu month of Ashwin (October) and celebrates the  victory of the goddess Durga on the buffalo-demon Mahishasura. The other Navaratri is in the waxing fortnight of Chaitra (March). On each of nine days, one of Varanasi's goddess temples – corresponding to one of the Navadurga (nine Durgas) or nine Gauris (Parvatis) – is recommended to be visited. The nine-temple circuit is described in various  (texts narrating the greatness of the holy city of Varanasi/Kashi). Devotees flock to the temple in the evening of the fifth day of Navatri.

The yearly temple festival of Vishalakshi Temple is celebrated on Kajali Tij (Black Third), the third lunar day (tij) of the waning fortnight in Bhadrapada, the last month of the Indian rainy season. Women sing "amorous" rainy season songs called kajali (black) around this time. The holy day is observed especially for the welfare of brothers by women.

See also
Hindu temples in Varanasi

Notes

References

Bartaman, a Bengali magazine Sharad Sankhya 1410 (Bengali year) - details mentioned in the article Kashir Vishwanath Vishwanather Kashi by Suman Gupta at page 60.

Hindu temples in Varanasi
Shakti Peethas